Web tracking is the practice by which operators of websites and third parties collect, store and share information about visitors’ activities on the World Wide Web. Analysis of a user's behaviour may be used to provide content that enables the operator to infer their preferences and may be of interest to various parties, such as advertisers. Web tracking can be part of visitor management.

Uses of web tracking
The uses of web tracking include the following:

 Advertising companies actively collect information about users and make profiles that are used to individualize advertisements. User activities include websites visited, watched videos, interactions on social networks, and online transactions. Websites like Netflix and YouTube collect information about what shows users watch, which helps them suggest more shows that they might like. Search engines like Google will keep a record of what users search for, which could help them suggest more relevant searches in the future.
 Law enforcement agencies may use web tracking to spy on individuals and solve crimes.
 Web analytics focuses more on the performance of a website as a whole. Web tracking will give insight on how a website is being used and see how long a user spends on a certain page. This can be used to see who may have the most interest in the content of the website.
 Usability tests is the practice of testing how easy a design is to use. Users are observed as they complete tasks. This would help identify usability problems with a website's design so they can be fixed for easier navigation.

Methods of web tracking

IP address
Every device connected to the Internet is assigned a unique IP address, which is needed to enable devices to communicate with each other. With appropriate software on the host website, the IP address of visitors to the site can be logged and can also be used to determine the visitor’s geographical location. Logging the IP address can, for example, monitor if a person voted more than once, as well as their viewing pattern. Knowing the visitor’s location indicates, besides other things, the country. This may, for example, result in prices being quoted in the local currency, the price or the range of goods that are available, special conditions applying and in some cases requests from or responses to a certain country being blocked entirely. Internet users may circumvent censorship and geo-blocking and protect personal identity and location to stay anonymous on the internet using a VPN connection.

HTTP cookie
A HTTP cookie is code and information embedded onto a user’s device by a website when the user visits the website. The website might then retrieve the information on the cookie on subsequent visits to the website by the user. Cookies can be used to customise the user’s browsing experience and to deliver targeted ads. Some browsing activities that cookies can store are:
 pages and content a user browsed,
 what a user searched online,
 when a user clicked on an online advertisement,
 what time a user visited a site.

First- and third-party cookies
A first-party cookie is created by the website the user is visiting. These cookies are considered "good" since they help the user rather than spy on them. The main goal of first-party cookies is to recognize the user and their preferences so that their desired settings can be applied.

A third-party cookie is created by websites other than the one a user visits. They insert additional tracking code that can record a user's online activity. On-site analytics refers to data collection on the current site. It is used to measure many aspects of user interactions including the number of times a user visits.

Restrictions on third-party cookies introduced by web browsers are bypassed by some tracking companies using technique called CNAME cloaking, where a third-party tracking service is assigned a DNS record in the first-party origin domain (usually CNAME) so that it's masqueraded as first-party even though it's a separate entity in legal and organizational terms. This technique is blocked by some browsers and ad blockers using block lists of known trackers.

Other methods 
 Canvas fingerprinting allows websites to identify and track users using HTML5 canvas elements instead of using a browser cookie.
 Cross-device tracking are used by advertisers to help identify which channels are most successful in helping convert browsers into buyers.
 Click-through rate is used by advertisers to measure the number of clicks they receive on their ads per number of impressions.
 Mouse tracking collects the users mouse cursor positions on the computer.
Browser fingerprinting relies on your browser and is a way of identifying users every time they go online and track your activity. Through fingerprinting, websites can determine the users operating system, language, time zone, and browser version without your permission.
Supercookies or "evercookies" can not only be used to track users across the web, but they are also hard to detect and difficult to remove since they are stored in a different place than the standard cookies.
 Session replay scripts allows the ability to replay a visitor's journey on a web site or within a mobile application or web application.
 "Redirect tracking" is the use of redirect pages to track users across websites.
 Web beacons are commonly used to check whether or not an individual who received an email actually read it.
Favicons can be used to track users since they persist across browsing sessions.
Federated Learning of Cohorts (FLoC), trialed in Google Chrome in 2021, which intends to replace existing behavioral tracking which relies on tracking individual user actions and aggregating them on the server side with web browser declaring their membership in a behavioral cohort. EFF has criticized FLoC as retaining the fundamental paradigm of surveillance economy, where "each user’s behavior follows them from site to site as a label, inscrutable at a glance but rich with meaning to those in the know".
 "UID smuggling" was found to be prevalent and largely not mitigated by latest protection tools – such as Firefox's tracking protection and uBlock Origin – by a 2022 study which also contributed to countermeasures.

Controversy 
Web browsing is linked to a user's personal information. Location, interests, purchases, and more can be revealed just by what page a user visits. This allows them to draw conclusions about a user, and analyze patterns of activity. Use of web tracking can be controversial when applied in the context of a private individual; and to varying degrees is subject to legislation such as the EU's eCommerce Directive and the UK's Data Protection Act. When it is done without the knowledge of a user, it may be considered a breach of browser security.

Justification 
In a business-to-business context, understanding a visitor's behavior in order to identify buying intentions is seen by many commercial organizations as an effective way to target marketing activities. Visiting companies can be approached, both online and offline, with marketing and sales propositions which are relevant to their current requirements. From the point of view of a sales organization, engaging with a potential customer when they are actively looking to buy can produce savings in otherwise wasted marketing funds.

Prevention 
The most advanced protection tools are or include Firefox's tracking protection and the browser addons uBlock Origin and Privacy Badger.

Moreover, they may include the browser addon NoScript, the use of an alternative search engine like DuckDuckGo and the use of a VPN. However, VPNs cost money and as of 2023 NoScript may "make general web browsing a pain".

On mobile
On mobile, the most advanced method may be use of the mobile browser Firefox Focus, which mitigates web tracking on mobile to a large extent, including Total Cookie Protection and similar to the private mode in the conventional Firefox browser.

Opt-out requests
Users can also control third-party web tracking to some extent by other means. Opt-out cookies enables users to block websites from installing future cookies. Websites may be blocked from installing third party advertisers or cookies on a browser which will prevent tracking on the users page. Do Not Track is a web browser setting that can request a web application to disable the tracking of a user. Enabling this feature will send a request to the website users are on to voluntarily disable their cross-site user tracking.

Privacy mode
Contrary to popular belief, browser privacy mode does not prevent (all) tracking attempts because it usually only blocks the storage of information on the visitor site (cookies). It does not help, however, against the various fingerprinting methods. Such fingerprints can be de-anonymized. Many times, the functionality of the website fails. For example, one may not be able to log in to the site, or preferences are lost.

Browsers
Some web browsers use "tracking protection" or "tracking prevention" features to block web trackers. The teams behind the NoScript and uBlock addons have assisted with developing Firefox' SmartBlock's capabilities.

See also 

 Behavioral analytics provides insight into the actions of people when they are online, usually when they purchase products online.
 Consumer Data Industry Association 
 Employee monitoring is the use of workplace surveillance to gather information on the activities and locations of employees.
 Gemini space and Gopher as alternatives serving mostly textual content without tracking
 Google Chrome#User tracking concerns
 GPS tracking can track the location of an entity or object remotely
 Internet privacy is the level of privacy an individual has while they are connected to the internet 
 Internet tracking
 Information privacy
 Network surveillance
 Track and trace is used to track a product's status and monitor their location when transported
 Web analytics is the reporting and analysis of website data to improve the user's experience 
 Web beacon is an invisible graphic that is placed on a website to monitor the behavior of the user visiting.

References

External links 
 
 

Internet privacy
Web analytics
Tracking
Mass surveillance
Privacy